"To Tomorrow / Final Squall / The Curtain Rises" is the 31st single by the Japanese female group Cute released on March 29, 2017, on the Zetima label.

It was Cute's final single, as the group disbanded in the summer of 2017.

Background
The single was announced on January 5, 2017 at the group's New Year's Concert at Nakano Sun Plaza. At the concert it was announced that the single would be released on March 22.

On January 30, the Hello! Project official website posted an announcement that the release date would be postponed "due to production circumstances". This alerted the group's fans and aroused speculations about whether the single would be released.

Release
The album was released in seven versions: four limited and three regular editions. All the regular editions will be CD-only, while all the limited editions included an additional DVD.

Track listing

CD (all editions)

Charts

References

External links 
 Profile of the single on the Hello! Project official website
 Profile of the single on the Up-Front Works official website

2017 singles
Japanese-language songs
Cute (Japanese idol group) songs
Zetima Records singles
2017 songs